Gastón Carlos Perkins (April 15, 1928– April 19, 2006) was an Argentine racing driver. He won the Turismo Carretera championship in 1969.

Racing career 
Perkins started his racing career in 1952. He was one of the Argentine drivers who participated in the Marathon de la Route (Nürburgring) in 1969 with Eduardo Rodríguez Canedo and Jorge Cupeiro.

He won three titles in Turismo Nacional (Class B) in  1963, 1964 and 1965, with Renault Dauphine. In 1969 he was Turismo Carretera champion with a Torino.

He died in his hometown, Juan Bautista Alberdi, Buenos Aires Province, in 2006 at the age of 78.

References

External links
 

1928 births
2006 deaths
Racing drivers from Buenos Aires
Argentine racing drivers
Turismo Carretera drivers
Argentine people of English descent